Major Payne is a 1995 American military comedy film directed by Nick Castle and starring Damon Wayans, who wrote with Dean Lorey and Gary Rosen. The film co-stars Karyn Parsons, Steven Martini and Michael Ironside. It is a loose remake of the 1955 film The Private War of Major Benson, starring Charlton Heston.  Major Payne was released in the United States on March 24 and grossed $30 million.  Wayans plays a military officer who, after being discharged, attempts to lead a dysfunctional group of youth cadets to victory in a competition.

Plot
Major Benson Winifred Payne, a battle hardened Marine, returns from a successful drug raid in South America to find out that he has been passed over for promotion. Payne receives an honorable discharge and tries to adjust to civilian life but ends up being arrested.  His former commander gets him out of jail and secures him a position back in the military.

Payne is sent to Madison Preparatory School in Virginia and is given command of the  ROTC students.  The cadets are a disorderly group of delinquents and outcasts who have placed last in the Virginia Military Games for eight straight years.  Payne immediately takes a hard stance with the cadets and asserts his authority.  He shaves the cadets bald and moves them out of their dorms and into a dilapidated barracks.  Payne's harsh punishments and lack of empathy for the cadets lead to friction with school counselor Emily Walburn, who tries to soften Payne's approach.

The cadets, encouraged by the rebellious Alex Stone, make several attempts to sabotage Payne and drive him out of the school.  Stone and the cadets hire a biker to assault Payne, in the aftermath Payne makes Stone the squad leader.  Things come to a head and Payne offers to quit if the cadets can steal him the Military Games trophy from Wellington Academy.  Payne tips off the Wellington cadets and they ambush the Madison cadets and beat them severely.  Stone confronts Payne and realizes that he wants to earn the trophy, Payne offers to train him to win it.  The cadets begin working hard and training for the Military Games.  They develop into a unified squad, and Payne tells them that they have graduated the program and are fit to compete in the games.

Before the games, Payne is asked to return to the Marines to fight in Bosnia.  He eagerly accepts the new posting but his deployment means he will miss the Military Games.  As Payne waits for a train to depart he daydreams about being in a family with Emily and Tiger.  The cadets don't want to participate in the Games without Payne, but Alex convinces them to do it.  At the games, the boys hold their own until Alex injures his ankle and is unable to participate in the final event. The Madison cadets angrily fight with the Wellington cadets. The fight is broken up, and the judges deliberate having Madison disqualified.

Payne refuses his new posting and commission and shows up at the last minute.  He smooths things over with the judges and tells Tiger to lead Madison in the final event, a drill competition. The group executes an unorthodox but entertaining routine which wins them the trophy. On the first day of the new school year Madison displays the Military Games trophy, along with another one won by Alex.  Payne resumes being an instructor, having married Emily and adopted Tiger. Stone resumes his role as a squad leader. Payne has softened a bit, attempting to befriend the new recruits. When a disrespectful blind cadet shows up with his service dog, Payne shaves both him and his dog bald with his field knife and laughs.

Cast
 Damon Wayans as Major Benson Winifred Payne, a battle-hardened Marine.  Payne has difficulty adjusting to life outside the military.
 Karyn Parsons as Emily Walburn, the school counselor.  She and Payne clash over his style of training the cadets.
 William Hickey as Dr. Phillips, the headmaster of the school.  He takes little interest in the cadets and asks Payne to keep them out of his way.
 Steven Martini as Cadet Alex J. Stone, a rebellious teenager with no respect for authority.  He opposes Payne's hardline approach to training and actively works to get rid of Payne.
 Michael Ironside as Lieutenant Colonel Stone, Alex's stepfather.  He's an alcoholic who abuses Alex.  
 Orlando Brown as Cadet Kevin "Tiger" Dunn, an orphan adopted by the school and raised by Emily Walburn.  The youngest of the cadets, he struggles to keep up with the others and find his place.
 Albert Hall as General Elias Decker, Payne's former commanding officer.
 Andrew Harrison Leeds as Cadet Dotson, a brown-noser who is cadet squad leader.  
 Damien Dante Wayans as Cadet Dwight "D" Williams
 Chris Owen as Cadet Wuliger
 Stephen Coleman as Cadet Leland
 Mark Madison as Cadet Fox
 Peyton Chesson-Fohl as Cadet Sergeant Johnson
 Bam Bam Bigelow as Biker.  He is hired by the cadets to confront Payne and intimidate him into leaving.
 George Cheung as Vietcong Guerrilla from Major Payne's Daydream
 R. Stephen Wiles as Cadet Heathcoat
 R. J. Knoll as Blind New Cadet

Filming
Major Payne was filmed at the Miller School of Albemarle in Charlottesville, Virginia.

Reception
Review aggregator Rotten Tomatoes gave the film an approval rating of 29% based on 14 reviews.  Kevin Thomas of the Los Angeles Times wrote, "While Major Payne is too predictable for most adults, it's an ideal entertainment for youthful audiences that allows Damon Wayans to be at his best in a dream part."  Caryn James of The New York Times wrote, "Though the movie is rarely more clever than its title, Mr. Wayans gives the dark cartoonish comedy an irreverent edge."

Roger Ebert of the Chicago Sun-Times rated it 3/4 stars and called it a smart and funny satire of military films:The key to this kind of comedy is to go all the way with it, and Wayans creates a comic character out of narrowness, obsession, and blind commitment. Of course the arc of the storyline is familiar; we know the pretty teacher will soften him, and that he will grow fond of the cadets, and no prizes for guessing who wins the big all-Virginia ROTC [sic] competition... Wayans is one of the most talented comic actors around, especially when he lets go and swings for the fences.

Box office
The film debuted at number 2 at the US box office behind Outbreak with a gross of $7 million on its opening weekend. Major Payne went on to gross $30.1 million worldwide.

References

External links

 
 

1995 films
1995 comedy films
American comedy films
Remakes of American films
1990s English-language films
Films about educators
Universal Pictures films
Military humor in film
Films about the United States Army
Films about the United States Marine Corps
Films directed by Nick Castle
Films scored by Craig Safan
Films set in Virginia
Films shot in Virginia
Films set in boarding schools
1990s American films